Asda Mobile is a mobile virtual network operator (MVNO) in the United Kingdom operated by Asda and using the Vodafone network. Asda Mobile previously used the EE network before reverting to Vodafone in 2021. Asda Mobile is available in over 360 stores across the UK and online through purchasing either a SIM card (standard, micro or nano SIM) or through an Asda Mobile handset.

Handsets 
There are many phones available from Asda, either in store or from their online service Asda.com. Asda sells both unlocked and locked phones: locked phones are locked to one of the major networks in the UK and sold with their SIM and potential phone customisations.

Coverage and network 
Asda Mobile initially used the Vodafone infrastructure until 2013, when it switched to EE. A return to Vodafone was announced in October 2020, with customers being switched over in February 2021. The move brought additional features, including WiFi Calling and unlimited data plans.

Awards 
Asda Mobile was awarded the Which? award for "Best Mobile Network" for 2010, 2011 and 2012, and was recommended in 2016. Asda Mobile was also named as a Which? recommended provider for 2019 and 2018. Awards were based on coverage, pricing and customer service.

References

External links
Official Website
Old Website
price comparison on three.co.uk

Mobile virtual network operators
British companies established in 2007
Telecommunications companies established in 2007
Mobile phone companies of the United Kingdom